Vinyl alcohol, also called ethenol (IUPAC name; not ethanol) or ethylenol, is the simplest enol. With the formula , it is a labile compound that converts to acetaldehyde. It is not a precursor to polyvinyl alcohol.

Synthesis
Vinyl alcohol can be formed by the pyrolytic elimination of water from ethylene glycol at a temperature of 900 °C and low pressure.

Tautomerization of vinyl alcohol to acetaldehyde
Under normal conditions, vinyl alcohol converts (tautomerizes) to acetaldehyde:

At room temperature, acetaldehyde is more stable than vinyl alcohol by 42.7 kJ/mol:

          ΔH298,g = −42.7 kJ/mol

The uncatalyzed keto–enol tautomerism by a 1,3-hydrogen migration is forbidden by the Woodward–Hoffmann rules and therefore has a high activation barrier and is not a significant pathway at or near room temperature. However, even trace amounts of acids or bases (including water) can catalyze the reaction. Even with rigorous precautions to minimize adventitious moisture or proton sources, vinyl alcohol can only be stored for minutes to hours before it isomerizes to acetaldehyde. (Carbonic acid is another example of a substance that is stable when rigorously pure, but decomposes rapidly due to catalysis by trace moisture.)

The tautomerization can also be catalyzed via photochemical process. These findings suggest that the keto–enol tautomerization is a viable route under atmospheric and stratospheric conditions, relevant to a role for vinyl alcohol in the production of organic acids in the atmosphere.

Vinyl alcohol can be stabilized by controlling the water concentration in the system and utilizing the kinetic favorability of the deuterium-produced kinetic isotope effect (kH+/kD+ = 4.75, kH2O/kD2O = 12). Deuterium stabilization can be accomplished through hydrolysis of a ketene precursor in the presence of a slight stoichiometric excess of heavy water (D2O). Studies show that the tautomerization process is significantly inhibited at ambient temperatures ( kt ≈ 10−6 M/s), and the half-life of the enol form can easily be increased to t1/2 = 42 minutes for first-order hydrolysis kinetics.

Relationship to poly(vinyl alcohol)
Because of the instability of vinyl alcohol, the thermoplastic polyvinyl alcohol (PVA or PVOH) is made indirectly by polymerization of vinyl acetate followed by hydrolysis of the ester bonds (Ac = acetyl; HOAc = acetic acid):

As a ligand
Several metal complexes are known that contain vinyl alcohol as a ligand. One example is Pt(acac)(η2-C2H3OH)Cl.

Occurrence in interstellar medium
Vinyl alcohol was detected in the molecular cloud Sagittarius B. Its stability in the (dilute) interstellar medium shows that its tautomerization does not happen unimolecularly.

References

Enols
Vinyl compounds
Organic compounds with 2 carbon atoms